Duffie Stone is an American attorney who has served as the circuit solicitor of South Carolina's 14th judicial district since 2006.

Education
Stone graduated from Wofford College and the University of South Carolina School of Law.

Circuit solicitor
Stone was appointed by Governor Mark Sanford to replace Randolph Murdaugh III in 2006, after Murdaugh retired from office. He was re-elected in 2008, 2012, 2016, and 2020. He is a member of the Republican Party.

Stone recused himself and his office from investigating and later prosecuting the Trial of Alex Murdaugh in 2021 due to the Murdaugh family's connections with the 14th judicial district.

References

Living people
21st-century American politicians
South Carolina Republicans
South Carolina state solicitors
University of South Carolina School of Law alumni
Wofford College alumni